Etenesh Diro Neda (born 10 May 1991, in Jeldu) is an Ethiopian athlete. She competed in the 3000 metres steeplechase at the 2012 Summer Olympics and the 2016 Summer Olympics. In 2012, she qualified for the final by placing second in her heat with a time of 9:25.31, then placed sixth in the final with a time of 9:19.89, a personal best. In 2016, she was implicated in a collision and lost one shoe. Unable to put it back without losing too much time, she finished the qualifier in 7th place with only one shoe. Because of that, she was affectionately named the Cinderella of Rio2016 .

Achievements

References

External links

1991 births
Living people
Ethiopian female long-distance runners
Ethiopian female steeplechase runners
Olympic athletes of Ethiopia
Athletes (track and field) at the 2012 Summer Olympics
Athletes (track and field) at the 2016 Summer Olympics
Sportspeople from Oromia Region
World Athletics Championships athletes for Ethiopia
21st-century Ethiopian women